Pedro Nieto Antúnez (18 August 1898 – 6 December 1978) was a Spanish admiral who served as Minister of the Navy of Spain between 1962 and 1969, as well as acting Minister of the Army in February 1964, during the Francoist dictatorship.

References

1898 births
1978 deaths
Defence ministers of Spain
Government ministers during the Francoist dictatorship